This is a list of electoral results for the Electoral district of Applecross in Western Australian state elections.

Members for Applecross

Election results

Elections in the 1990s

Elections in the 1980s

References

Western Australian state electoral results by district